Kołdrąb  is a village in the administrative district of Gmina Janowiec Wielkopolski, within Żnin County, Kuyavian-Pomeranian Voivodeship, in north-central Poland.

Notable residents 
 Fritz Schlieper (1892–1977), German general

References

Villages in Żnin County